SS Marina may refer to a number of ships.

, a Donaldson Line steamship torpedoed in 1916 by U-55.
Two of Marinas crew were killed in the explosion.
, C-1-A cargo ship, USMC then A. H. Hull & Co.
, built as SS Empire Antigua. Carried the name Marina shortly before scrapping in 1968.

Ship names